The 2017 Mundialito de Clubes was the fifth edition of the Mundialito de Clubes (Club World Cup in English), a biennial international club beach soccer competition contested between top men's clubs from across the world (existing clubs and teams specially assembled for the event). The tournament is loosely similar to the FIFA Club World Cup in association football, however participating teams are not regional champions, entering via invitation.

Organised by Beach Soccer Worldwide (BSWW) and other local entities in Brazil, the competition took place in Vargem Grande Paulista, São Paulo State, Brazil between December 14 and 17, featuring eight clubs.

Barcelona were incumbent champions but did not enter a team this year. The tournament was won by Lokomotiv Moscow who became the first team to win two Mundialito de Clubes titles, beating Iranian club Pars Jonoubi 5–4 in the final.

Teams
Eight invited clubs entered the competition, representing six different nations and three continents. Africa, North America and Oceania are unrepresented.

Squads

Venue

One venue was used in the city of Vargem Grande Paulista, São Paulo.
An arena with a capacity of 2,000 at Rua Serra da Mantiqueira (Rua da Feira) hosted the matches.

Draw
The draw to split the eight teams into two groups of four was conducted by BSWW and took place in the afternoon of November 30.

Initially, two teams were automatically assigned to the groups:

to Group A: as the São Paulo based host club,  Corinthians
to Group B: the other seeded club,  Flamengo

The remaining six teams were split into three pots of two, shown in the below table.

The clubs were paired into pots based on similar geographical proximity. From each pot, one team was drawn into Group A and the other team was drawn into Group B.

Group stage
All times are local, BRST (UTC–2).

Group A

Group B

Play-offs

Seventh place play-off

Fifth place play-off

Third place play-off

Final

Awards

Top goalscorers
Players with 3 or more goals
7 goals

 Igor Rangel ( Botafogo)

6 goals

 Benjamin Jr. ( Flamengo)
 Artur Paporotnyi ( Corinthians)

5 goals

 Farid Boulokbashi ( Pars Jonoubi)
 Nelito ( Lokomotiv Moscow)
 Boris Nikonorov ( Lokomotiv Moscow)

4 goals

 Pablo Perez ( Levante)
 Angelo Agustini ( Rosario Central)
 Mostafa Kiani ( Pars Jonoubi)
 Dejan Stankovic ( Lokomotiv Moscow)

3 goals

 Thanger Nascimento ( Flamengo)
 Anderson Wesley ( Flamengo)
 Duarte Vivo ( Sporting CP)
 Mohammad Masoumizadeh ( Pars Jonoubi)
 Moslem Mesigar ( Pars Jonoubi)
 Ali Mirshekari ( Pars Jonoubi)
 Ozu Moreira ( Lokomotiv Moscow)
 Deiwerson Pureza Oureza ( Flamengo)
 Jordan Santos ( Sporting CP)

Source

Final standings

References

External links
Mundialito de Clubes 2017, at Beach Soccer Worldwide
Club Mundialito 2017, at Beach Soccer Russia (in Russian)

Mundialito de Clubes
Mundialito de Clubes
2017 in beach soccer
Mundialito de Clubes